The Association of Social Workers (ASW) was the main professional body for non-specialised social workers in the United Kingdom. It was established as the British Federation of Social Workers (BFSW) in 1935 and changed its name in 1951. From 1949 it opened its membership to all social workers and from 1951 promoted itself as the body to join to work towards a unified profession.

In 1970 the association finally achieved its aim by merging with six other social workers' organisations to form the British Association of Social Workers, having been a member of the Standing Conference of Organisations of Social Workers which had been led by Kay McDougall.

References

External links
Catalogue of the ASW archives, held at the Modern Records Centre, University of Warwick

Social work organisations in the United Kingdom
Organizations established in 1935
Organizations disestablished in 1970